Crescent City Junior-Senior High School is a high school in Crescent City, Florida, United States for 7th to 12th graders. Its sports teams are known as "The Raiders". The school is operated by Putnam County School District. There are approximately 1000 students attending currently. Current courses include Health Sciences, Chorus and Band, Teacher Assisting, Welding, and ROTC. CCJSHS is currently a "B" school, with plans of becoming an "A" school.

References 

High schools in Putnam County, Florida
Public high schools in Florida
Public middle schools in Florida